Sheikh Raad Mutar Saleh (died October 11, 2006) led the tiny Mandaean community in Iraq until being shot dead by unknown assassins in Suweira, 65 km southeast of Baghdad in the Tigris river valley.

References 

Year of birth missing
2006 deaths
2006 murders in Iraq
Iraqi murder victims
Deaths by firearm in Iraq
People murdered in Iraq